Changes is Lisa Miskovsky's third album released in 2006.

Track listing 
"Little Bird"
"Acceptable Losses"
"Mary"
"Been Through This"
"Foxholes"
"California Heart"
"Sweet Misery"
"Last Year's Song"
"As Daylight Fades"
"Please"
"Once Gone, Always Missing"
"20th of December Madison Avenue"

External links
Complete album lyrics

2006 albums
Lisa Miskovsky albums